Un soir au club is a 2009 French film directed by  Jean Achache based on the novel of the same name  Un soir au club by Christian Gailly.

Plot 
A former jazz pianist visits a jazz club and is drawn back into the jazz scene.

Cast
 Thierry Hancisse as Simon Nardis
 Élise Caron as Debbie Parker
 Marilyne Canto as Suzanne
 Anne Kessler as Anne
 Jean-Paul Bathany as Moineau
 Geordy Monfils as Nicolas
 Gaetan Nicot as Le pianiste
 Xavier Lugué as Le bassiste
 Marc Delouya as Le batteur

References

External links
 
 
 

2000s French-language films
French drama films
2009 films
2000s French films